Andrew Rogers may refer to:

Andrew Rogers (footballer) (born 1964), Australian rules footballer
Andrew Rogers (judge) (born 1933), Australian judge of the NSW Supreme Court
Andrew Rogers (artist), Australian artist
Andrew Rogers (singer)
Andrew Rogers (journalist) (born 1962), British author and journalist living in Amsterdam
Andrew J. Rogers (1828–1900), American politician
Andy Rogers (born 1986), ice hockey player
Andy Rogers (footballer) (born 1956), English former footballer

See also
Andy Rodgers (born 1983), footballer